The Loyola Wolf Pack football team was an intercollegiate American football team for Loyola University located in New Orleans, Louisiana, United States. The university formerly sponsored a varsity football team starting in 1921. The team was disbanded after the 1939 season for financial reasons. The team played at Loyola University Stadium starting in 1928.

History
The 1926 football team went undefeated finishing with a 10-0 record behind the play of Bucky Moore.

Head coaches

Notable players

Loyola Wolf Pack players in the NFL

See also
Loyola Wolf Pack

References

 
American football teams established in 1921
Sports clubs disestablished in 1939
1921 establishments in Louisiana
1939 disestablishments in Louisiana